Robert Winston (August 5, 1847 – after 1913) was an American football coach.  He served as the head football coach at  Syracuse University in 1890 and at the University of Georgia in 1894, compiling a career record of 12–5. 

Winston was British and had previously coached the Blackheath Harriers rugby team in England. He was also a "bantam boxer" and trainer for an athletic club in London, before coming to the United States in 1883.  After moving to the United States, Winston also helped train other American football teams at Yale University (1883–1888), Amherst College (1889), and the University of Rochester (1890), Williams College, Princeton University and other New England based teams. Winston also worked at the Berkeley Athletic club in New York. After Yale, Winston also oversaw the building of a gymnasium in Townsend, Washington in 1887.

He was the first coach of the Syracuse and Georgia football teams to receive a salary. During his single season at Georgia in 1894, Wintson's team compiled a record of 5–1 including a win against the Auburn Tigers.

Head coaching record

References

Additional sources
 John F. Stegeman, The Ghosts of Herty Field: Early Days on a Southern Gridiron, pp. 22–23, University of Georgia Press, Athens, Georgia, 1966, Library of Congress Catalog Card Number: 66-27606

1847 births
20th-century deaths
Year of death missing
English rugby union coaches
Amherst Mammoths football coaches
Georgia Bulldogs football coaches
Rochester Yellowjackets football coaches
Syracuse Orange football coaches
Yale Bulldogs football coaches
People from Fulham
English emigrants to the United States